Les Enfants terribles (literal English translation: The Terrible Children) is a 1950 French film directed by Jean-Pierre Melville and with a screenplay adapted by Jean Cocteau from his 1929 novel of the same name.

Plot
Elisabeth looks after her bedridden mother and is very protective of her teenage brother Paul, particularly after he is injured in a snowball fight and has to withdraw from school. The siblings rarely leave their house, and, other than a doctor and maid, their only visitor is Paul's friend Gérard, who has a crush on Elisabeth. Gérard often sleeps over, spending much of his time watching Elisabeth and Paul fight and play secret games in their shared bedroom.

After Elisabeth and Paul's mother dies, Elisabeth becomes a model for a couturier and meets Agathe, who she invites to live in her mother's old room. The shy girl bears a strong resemblance to Paul's former classmate Dargelos, the boy who injured Paul and with whom Paul is infatuated. Paul and Agathe are immediately attracted to each other, but it takes both of them some time to realize it.

Elisabeth starts to date Michael, a rich young American businessman, and they get married. When he dies in a car crash shortly after the wedding, Elisabeth inherits his fortune and mansion and brings Paul and Agathe to live with her. When his uncle is out of the country, Gérard stays with them, as well. At first, everyone sleeps in Elisabeth's room, but, after a fight with Elisabeth, Paul sets up a living space in another wing of the building. Agathe and Gérard also start to mostly sleep in their own rooms, and Elisabeth begins to feel lonely.

In the course of her investigation of the breakdown of her social circle, Elisabeth learns that Agathe loves Paul, but thinks he hates her, and that Paul has written Agathe a letter to declare his love for her. Instead of bringing the two together, however, Elisabeth intercepts the letter and destroys it, and then convinces Gérard and Agathe to marry each other. They move out, and Elisabeth has Paul to herself again, though they still are living in separate parts of the mansion and Paul is now despondent over the loss of Agathe.

One day, Agathe and Gérard visit. Gérard brings an exotic poison that Dargelos, who Gérard had run into, asked Gérard to give Paul, as Paul and Dargelos were both interested in poisons when they went to school together. Some time later, Agathe awakens Elisabeth to say she just got a letter from Paul in which he said he was going to take the poison. The women rush to Paul and find him near death. While Elisabeth is out of the room, Paul and Agathe figure out that Elisabeth had lied to keep them apart. Elisabeth returns and, realizing she has been found out, says she could not lose Paul to Agathe. Paul dies blaming his sister for his woes, and Elisabeth shoots herself in the head.

Cast

Production
Melville's first feature film, Le Silence de la mer (1949), attracted the attention of Jean Cocteau, who commissioned Melville to direct a film adaptation Les Enfants terribles. The film was shot on location in Paris (at the Société nationale des entreprises de presse and the Théâtre Pigalle), Montmorency (the seaside shoplifting scene), and Ermenonville (Michael's car accident scene). The car accident scene was directed by Cocteau, as Melville was ill the day it was filmed. Melville said Cocteau followed his directing instructions "to the letter."

Release
Les Enfants terribles was released in Paris on 29 March 1950. It did not earn as much as Melville's previous film Le Silence de la mer, taking in 255,224 admissions in Paris and 719,844 admissions in France as a whole.

References

Sources

External links
 
 
Les enfants terribles: Hazards of a Snowball Fight an essay by Gary Indiana at The Criterion Collection

1950 films
1950 drama films
French drama films
1950s French-language films
French black-and-white films
Incest in film
Films based on French novels
Films based on works by Jean Cocteau
Films directed by Jean-Pierre Melville
Films with screenplays by Jean Cocteau
1950s French films